"Under Attack" is a song by Swedish pop group ABBA, released in December 1982 as the second and final single from the compilation The Singles: The First Ten Years.

Background
ABBA recorded "Under Attack" between 2 and 4 August 1982 at Polar Music Studios, Stockholm. The group had originally intended to release a new studio album, but instead decided to release a double-album compilation of their past singles while adding two new songs from the session. The two new tracks that made it onto The Singles: The First Ten Years were "The Day Before You Came" and "Under Attack". The latter would eventually be added to the expanded editions of The Visitors album.

On 11 December 1982, ABBA performed "Under Attack" on the BBC's Late Late Breakfast Show, in what was their last collective performance.

Reception
"Under Attack" was not a commercial success upon its release. ABBA's popularity was in decline and the two preceding singles ("Head over Heels" and "The Day Before You Came") had failed to reach No. 1 anywhere. Although a Top 5 hit in Belgium and the Netherlands, and a Top 20 single in a couple of other European charts, it did not become a major hit anywhere else. It peaked at No. 26 in the United Kingdom. In Australia, where the group's popularity only a few years earlier had rivaled that of The Beatles, "Under Attack" only reached No. 96 in the singles chart. "Under Attack" became ABBA's lowest charting single since "So Long". After the single's release, ABBA went on a temporary hiatus that effectively lasted for almost 40 years.

"Under Attack" is featured in the musical theatre production Mamma Mia! but not in the film.

Music video
ABBA filmed a music video for "Under Attack" on 16 November 1982. Set in an empty warehouse, the video involves ABBA navigating their way through a room filled with red beacon lights. The video ends with the four members walking away in the distance, their backs to the camera, reaching the end of ABBA.

Personnel
 Agnetha Fältskog – lead vocals
 Anni-Frid Lyngstad – backing vocals
 Björn Ulvaeus – guitar, vocoder vocals  
 Benny Andersson – keyboards, synthesizer

Charts

References

1982 singles
1983 singles
ABBA songs
Songs written by Benny Andersson and Björn Ulvaeus
1982 songs
Polar Music singles
Songs about stalking